The 2006 South Africa Sevens was an international rugby sevens tournament which took place on 8–9 December at Outeniqua Park in George, Western Cape as part of the IRB Sevens World Series. The tournament was the second event of the 2006–07 season, and it was the eighth edition of the South Africa Sevens.  won the tournament, defeating the host nation  by 24–17 in the final.

Pool stages

Pool A

|width=10| 
|Results
 Fiji 22–14 Canada	 
 Samoa 28–12 Zimbabwe
 Fiji 47–7 Zimbabwe	 
 Samoa 31–10 Canada
 Canada 19–0 Zimbabwe	 
 Fiji 45–5 Samoa
|}

Pool B

|width=10| 
|Results
 England 14–14 Wales	 
 Argentina 19–12 Portugal
 England 58–5 Portugal	 
 Argentina 7–10 Wales
 Wales 17–5 Portugal	 
 England 26–7 Argentina
|}

Pool C

|width=10| 
|Results
 South Africa 45–7 Kenya	 
 France 22–7 Uganda
 South Africa 57–0 Uganda	 
 France 22–19 Kenya
 Kenya 33–0 Uganda	 
 South Africa 34–0 France
|}

Group D

|width=10| 
|Results
 New Zealand 35–5 Scotland	 
 Australia 12–21 Tunisia
 New Zealand 33–0 Tunisia	 
 Australia 31–12 Scotland
 Scotland 14–33 Tunisia	 
 New Zealand 29–14 Australia
|}

Finals
 1/4 final Bowl (Match 25) – Canada 19–12 Portugal
 1/4 final Bowl (Match 26) – Australia 36–0 Uganda
 1/4 final Bowl (Match 27) – Kenya 15–10 Scotland
 1/4 final Bowl (Match 28) – Argentina 19–14 Zimbabwe
 1/4 final Cup (Match 29) – Fiji 33–7 Wales
 1/4 final Cup (Match 30) – New Zealand 29–0 France
 1/4 final Cup (Match 31) – South Africa 38–0 Tunisia
 1/4 final Cup (Match 32) – England 24–0 Samoa
 SF Shield (Match 33) – Portugal 31–5 Uganda	
 SF Shield (Match 34) – Scotland 19–26 Zimbabwe
 SF Bowl (Match 35) – Canada 5–31 Australia
 SF Bowl (Match 36) – Kenya 19–17 Argentina
 SF Plate (Match 37) – Wales 29–24 France
 SF Plate (Match 38) – Tunisia 19–7 Samoa
 SF Cup (Match 39) – Fiji 12–29 New Zealand
 SF Cup (Match 40) – South Africa 10–7 England
 Final Shield (Match 41) – Portugal 14–12 Zimbabwe
 Final Bowl (Match 42) – Australia 41–7 Kenya
 Final Plate (Match 43) – Wales 26–5 Tunisia
 Final Cup (Match 44) – New Zealand 24–17 South Africa

Series standings
After completion of Round 2:

 was the first team to score 1,000 all-time points in this round after beating  by 29–0 in the Cup quarter final stage.

References

External links
 
  on irbsevens.com

Sevens
South Africa
South Africa Sevens